Berri (born Rebecca Sleight, 1974, York) is an English singer, best known for her 1995 hit single, "The Sunshine After the Rain", which was originally recorded by Ellie Greenwich in 1968 and later was a hit for Elkie Brooks, reaching number 10 in 1977.

"The Sunshine After the Rain" was released twice, peaking at number 26 in the UK Singles Chart in December 1994, and, after a re-release, at number four in September 1995. For the first release, the credits were to New Atlantic/U4EA featuring Berri.

Berri received sole artist credit on the second release, which was the 45th biggest-selling UK single of 1995, and the 77th highest selling single of 1995 in Australia. "The Sunshine After the Rain" was also certified gold in Australia.

Her follow-up single, "Shine Like a Star", peaked at number 20 in the UK in December 1995. An album, About Time, was also released in 1996 in Japan. In 1998, Berri was the featured vocalist on the Hectors House track "Come and Get My Lovin", and contributed vocals to the track "Here Comes the Rain" for Indigo.

In 1999 Berri was the featured vocalist on 'Last Night A DJ Saved My Life' by A Few Good Loops.

In 2000, Berri recorded the dance track "Do U Believe" with Plasma. In 2014, Berri provided vocals to "The Perfect Kiss" for Mono Life. In 2017, Berri returned to the stage appearing at the 'Return to the 80s and 90s' festival in Leicester in August 2017.

Afterwards, she worked with a number of bands, including Degrassi, hailing from Tooting Bec. Berri also performed and recorded as part of the folk duo The Raggy Anns.

In 2022 Berri returned to the recording studio working on new material, working with Rick Lloyde of New Atlantic.

Berri continues to perform at music festivals around the UK.

Discography

Singles

References

1974 births
Living people
English dance musicians
Eurodance musicians
Musicians from York
21st-century English women singers
21st-century English singers